Michael McNeill (born July 22, 1966) is an American former professional ice hockey player who played 63 games in the National Hockey League (NHL).  He played for the Chicago Blackhawks and Quebec Nordiques.

McNeil was born in Winona, Minnesota and raised in South Bend, Indiana.

McNeil played football, hockey and baseball in high school from 1980-84 before joining the Notre Dame Fighting Irish for four years. While playing for Notre Dame, he served as team captain.

In 2000, McNeill suffered a career-ending eye injury while playing for the Revier Lions in Germany.

In 2008, McNeill served as a volunteer assistant coach for the University of Notre Dame. Since 2011, McNeill has served as the programming and instruction program manager for the Notre Dame's Compton Family Ice Arena.

Personal life
McNeill's father Tim worked as an assistant coach for Notre Dame's hockey program. He grew up playing in the local IYHL (Irish Youth Hockey League), and he played at the local high school St. Joe, playing football, baseball, and of course hockey. He now coaches the Irish Rovers 14u AA team.

References

External links

1966 births
Living people
American men's ice hockey left wingers
Chicago Blackhawks players
Halifax Citadels players
Ice hockey players from Indiana
Ice hockey players from Minnesota
Moncton Hawks players
National Hockey League supplemental draft picks
Notre Dame Fighting Irish men's ice hockey players
People from Blue Earth County, Minnesota
People from Winona, Minnesota
Quebec Nordiques players
Sportspeople from South Bend, Indiana
St. Louis Blues draft picks